Papilio garamas, commonly known as the magnificent swallowtail, is a species of Neotropical swallowtail butterfly found in Mexico, Guatemala, Honduras, Panama and Costa Rica.

Description
A large butterfly with a wingspan of 80 to 110 millimetres. The females are dimorphic, either resembling the male or dark forms lacking the cream median and postdiscal bands contrasting with deep black ground colour.

Subspecies

Papilio garamas garamas (western Mexico)
Papilio garamas abderus Hopffer, 1856 (eastern Mexico) generally seen as conspecific with P. garamas but sometimes treated as a distinct species (Collins & Morris 1985:87, Hancock 1983, Llorente-Bousquets et al. 1997).
Papilio garamas electryon Bates, 1864 (Guatemala to Honduras) may be placed in abderus
Papilio garamas syedra Godman & Salvin, 1878 (Panama, Costa Rica) may be placed in abderus
Papilio garamas baroni Rothschild & Jordan, 1906 (Mexico) may be placed in abderus

Taxonomy
Papilio garamas is a member of the homerus species group. The members of this clade are:
Papilio cacicus Lucas, 1852
Papilio euterpinus Salvin & Godman, 1868
Papilio garamas (Geyer, [1829])
Papilio homerus Fabricius, 1793
Papilio menatius (Hübner, [1819])
Papilio warscewiczii Hopffer, 1865

Papilio garamas is in the subgenus Pterourus Scopoli, 1777 which also includes the species groups: troilus species group, glaucus species group, the zagreus species group and the scamander species group.

Status
Not uncommon and not regarded as threatened. If the garamas subspecies other than garamas garamas are subspecies of abderus then garamas is a Mexican endemic, but a taxonomic clarification is required.

Etymology
Garamas was the son of Acacallis (Greek: Ἀκακαλλίς) in Greek mythology.

References

Hancock, D.L. (1983). Classification of the Papilionidae (Lepidoptera): a phylogenetic approach. Smithersia 2: 1-48.
Llorente-Bousquets, J.E., Onate-Ocana, L., Luis-Martinez, A. & Vargas-Fernandez, I. 1997. Papilionidae y Pieridae de México: distribución geográfica e ilustración. Comisión Nacional para el conocimiento y uso de la biodiversidad (CONABIO), Facultad de Ciencias, Universidad Nacional Autónoma de México (UNAM), Mexico; [x], 231 pp.
Lewis, H. L., 1974 Butterflies of the World  Page 24, figure 20

External links
Swallowtails.net images
Global Butterfly Information System Images of syntypes? in Museum für Naturkunde, Berlin.

gramas
Butterflies described in 1829
Papilionidae of South America